Hatfield's Ferry Power Station was a 1.7-gigawatt (1,700 MW), coal power plant located  in Greene County, Pennsylvania. The plant was operated by FirstEnergy. It began operations in 1969 and was shut down in 2013.

History
Hatfield's Ferry's construction commenced in 1963 and began generation in 1969 under the operations of Allegheny Energy.  FirstEnergy assumed operations of Hatfield's Ferry following its merger with Allegheny Energy in 2010.

Environmental mitigation
In the mid-1990s, Allegheny Energy installed a control system which reduced the plant's nitrogen oxide emissions. In 2001, Hatfield's Ferry added a natural gas reburn system. In that same year, Allegheny Energy introduced a passive treatment system where groundwater from the fly ash landfill is treated with wetlands. Allegheny Energy commissioned a flue-gas desulfurization (FGD) system, designed by Babcock & Wilcox, to be installed at Hatfield's Ferry in 2006.  The equipment, which cost $700 million to install, removed 95% of sulfur dioxide and lowered mercury emissions at the plant when it was activated in 2009.

Closure and future plans
On July 9, 2013, FirstEnergy announced they would be shutting down Hatfield's Ferry by October 9. The company decided against investing $245 million to retrofit Hatfield's Ferry in order to comply with the Environmental Protection Agency's (EPA) Mercury and Air Toxics Standards (MATS). In April 2017, FirstEnergy announced plans to sell part of the power plant site to APV Renaissance Partners Opco, a subsidiary of American Power Ventures LLC. In 2018 APV Renaissance received the final environmental permit required to break ground on a new 1,000-megawatt natural gas power plant on the site of the former coal pile. Completion of the project was expected by mid-2022. However, in June 2022 the Pittsburgh Post-Gazette cast doubt on the planned project, reporting that "the plan ultimately fell through."

Further reading
 Fact sheet: APV Renaissance Partners' 1,000 MW gas-fired power plant

See also

 List of power stations in Pennsylvania

References

Energy infrastructure completed in 1969
FirstEnergy
Former coal-fired power stations in the United States
Buildings and structures in Greene County, Pennsylvania
1969 establishments in Pennsylvania
2013 disestablishments in Pennsylvania
Former power stations in Pennsylvania